Koothanur Maha Saraswathi Temple is a Hindu temple located in the town of Koothanur in the Tiruvarur district of Tamil Nadu, India. It is dedicated to Saraswathi, the Hindu goddess of learning.

Significance 
Temples dedicated to Saraswati are very rare in India. The temple is Tamil Nadu's only Hindu temple with Saraswathi as main deity. Praises of the temple  were sung by Tamil poets Ottakoothar and Kambar. Vijayadasami is the most popular festival celebrated in the temple.

References 

Hindu temples in Tiruvarur district
Saraswati temples